In molecular biology mir-601 microRNA is a short RNA molecule. MicroRNAs function to regulate the expression levels of other genes by several mechanisms.

Molecular pathway regulation
miR-601 has been found to affect a number of different cell signalling pathways, more specifically bringing about downregulation of Fas-induced apoptosis and NF-kappa B signalling. There is additionally upregulation of the actin cytoskeleton and increased negative regulation of translational initiation by miR-601. The importance of NF-kappa B in tumour cell proliferation and enhanced survival means that miR-601 mimics may hold a lot of promise for prevention or treatment of carcinogenesis.

miR-602 has further been linked to the development and progression of gastric cancer, with levels significantly upregulated compared with normal gastric tissue.

See also 
 MicroRNA

References

External links
 

MicroRNA
MicroRNA precursor families